In enzymology, a L-arabinokinase is an enzyme that catalyzes the chemical reaction

ATP + L-arabinose  ADP + beta-L-arabinose 1-phosphate

Thus, the two substrates of this enzyme are ATP and L-arabinose, whereas its two products are ADP and beta-L-arabinose 1-phosphate.

This enzyme belongs to the family of transferases, specifically those transferring phosphorus-containing groups (phosphotransferases) with an alcohol group as acceptor.  The systematic name of this enzyme class is ATP:L-arabinose 1-phosphotransferase. This enzyme is also called L-arabinokinase (phosphorylating).  This enzyme participates in nucleotide sugars metabolism.

References

 

EC 2.7.1
Enzymes of unknown structure